Gyula Szilágyi (1913 – 21 August 1957) was a Hungarian wrestler. He competed in the men's Greco-Roman flyweight at the 1948 Summer Olympics.

References

External links
 

1913 births
1957 deaths
Hungarian male sport wrestlers
Olympic wrestlers of Hungary
Wrestlers at the 1948 Summer Olympics
Sportspeople from Győr